The Triflers is a 1924 American silent society drama film directed by Louis Gasnier and starring Mae Busch. It was produced by B. P. Schulberg and distributed by Preferred Pictures and Al Lichtman.

Plot
As described in a review in a film magazine, after inheriting great wealth, Marjorie (Busch) is besieged by suitors but she gives them all the cold shoulder. For one, Peter (Dexter), she feels pity and a touch of seriousness. One friend, Monte (Mayo), refuses to run after her and treats affairs with women lightly. In California they meet. When Teddy (Whitlock), one of the suitors, refuses to accept no, Monte saves Marjorie from an unpleasant situation and, without love, they marry for their mutual protection. After the wedding they both slip away following a few embarrassing moments in the bedroom and end up sleeping away from each other in bathtubs. Monte still treats her casually and she falls desperately in love with him. Marjorie again meets Peter who has become blind and he mistakes her pity for love, while Monte gets the same impression and decides to go away. Marjorie and Peter finally declare their love for each other, but Teddy in jealousy shoots them. The wounds are slight and in the hospital in twin beds, they feel they have atoned for being triflers with love, and face the future confidently.

Cast

Preservation status
A print of The Triflers is preserved in the Library of Congress collection.

References

External links

1924 films
American silent feature films
Films based on American novels
American black-and-white films
Silent American drama films
1924 drama films
Preferred Pictures films
1920s English-language films
Films directed by Louis J. Gasnier
1920s American films